Mirjana Lučić-Baroni was the defending champion, having won the event in 2013, but chose not to participate.

Carina Witthöft won the tournament, defeating Urszula Radwańska in the final, 6–3, 7–6(8–6).

Seeds

Main draw

Finals

Top half

Bottom half

References 
 Main draw

Open GDF Suez de Touraine - Singles